Marinescu is a Romanian surname deriving from the given name "Marin". Notable people with the surname include:

Alexandra Marinescu (born 1982), retired Romanian Olympic gymnast
Andrei Daniel Marinescu (born 1985), Romanian football player
Angela Marinescu (born 1941), Romanian poet
Gabriel Marinescu (1886–1940), Romanian general 
George Marinescu (mathematician) (born 1964), Romanian mathematician
Gheorghe Marinescu (1863–1938), Romanian neurologist
Ion C. Marinescu (1886–1956), Romanian politician 
Liviu Marinescu (born 1970), Romanian composer of orchestral and chamber music
Lucian Marinescu (born 1972), Romanian football player
Marian-Jean Marinescu (born 1952), Romanian politician
Medeea Marinescu (born 1974), Romanian film actress
Mihai Marinescu (born 1989), Romanian racing driver
Nicolae Marinescu (1906–1977), Romanian Olympic fencer
Nicolae Marinescu (general) (1884–1963), Romanian general and politician
Șerban Marinescu (born 1956), Romanian director and screenwriter
Tecla Marinescu (born 1960), Romanian sprint canoer
Ion Marin Sadoveanu (born Iancu-Leonte Marinescu), novelist and journalist

See also

 Alexander Marinesko (1913–1963), Soviet submarine captain
 Marienescu
 Marcu (name)
 Mărinești (disambiguation)

Romanian-language surnames
Patronymic surnames